In mathematical analysis, the Russo–Vallois integral is an extension to stochastic processes of the classical Riemann–Stieltjes integral 

 

The idea is to replace the derivative  by the difference quotient

 and to pull the limit out of the integral. In addition one changes the type of convergence.

Definitions
Definition: A sequence  of stochastic processes converges uniformly on compact sets in probability to a process 

if, for every  and 

One sets:

 
 

and

Definition: The forward integral is defined as the ucp-limit of 

: 

Definition: The backward integral is defined as the ucp-limit of 

: 

Definition: The generalized bracket is defined as the ucp-limit of 

: 

For continuous semimartingales  and a càdlàg function H, the Russo–Vallois integral coincidences with the usual Itô integral: 

 

In this case the generalised bracket is equal to the classical covariation. In the special case, this means that the process 

is equal to the quadratic variation process.

Also for the Russo-Vallois Integral an Ito formula holds: If  is a continuous semimartingale and 

then 

By a duality result of Triebel one can provide optimal classes of Besov spaces, where the Russo–Vallois integral can be defined. The norm in the Besov space 

 

is given by 

 

Then the following theorem holds:

Theorem: Suppose 

 

Then the Russo–Vallois integral 

 

exists and for some constant  one has 

Notice that in this case the Russo–Vallois integral coincides with the Riemann–Stieltjes integral and with the Young integral for functions with finite p-variation.

References

Definitions of mathematical integration
Stochastic processes